Alan Bliss (1921–1985)  was a noted British philologist. Much of his early work was concerned with Old and Middle English, the history of the English language, and medieval French philology (especially Anglo-Norman) and his later work with Hiberno-English. He was born in London, and attended  Finchley Catholic Grammar School, then King's College London, and then Balliol College, Oxford. His academic career began at Oxford but he soon, 1953, gained an appointment as Chair of English at the Royal University of Malta. This was followed by a professorship at the University of Istanbul. But In 1961 he took up an appointment in the Department of Old and Middle English at University College Dublin where he was to remain until the end of his career.

Selected publications
 Bliss, A. J. (1984). English in the south of Ireland. Language in the British isles, 135, 51.
 Bliss, A. J. (1972). Languages in contact: some problems of Hiberno-English. Proceedings of the Royal Irish Academy. Section C: Archaeology, Celtic Studies, History, Linguistics, Literature, 72, 63–82.
 Bliss, A. J. (1958). The metre of Beowulf. Oxford, Blackwell.
 Bliss, Alan. (1996). A Dictionary of Foreign Words and Phrases in Current English. Routledge, London. ISBN 0-415-05905-4

References

1921 births
1985 deaths
20th-century philologists
20th-century translators
Anglo-Saxon studies scholars
Alumni of Balliol College, Oxford
British expatriates in Malta
British expatriates in Turkey
British expatriates in Ireland